Ashland is a historic plantation house located near Henderson, Vance County, North Carolina.  It consists of two sections dated to the late-18th and mid-19th centuries. The older section is a two-story, two bay, frame section attached to the newer and taller two-story, three bay frame section. Each section is sheathed in weatherboard and topped by gable roofs. The house displays elements of Federal and Greek Revival style architecture.  Judge and colonizer Richard Henderson (1734–1785) owned the Ashland tract among his vast holdings.

The house was built c. 1740 by Samuel Henderson, father of Richard Henderson
It was listed on the National Register of Historic Places in 1973.

References

External links

Historic American Buildings Survey in North Carolina
Plantation houses in North Carolina
Houses on the National Register of Historic Places in North Carolina
Federal architecture in North Carolina
Greek Revival houses in North Carolina
Houses in Vance County, North Carolina
National Register of Historic Places in Vance County, North Carolina